Seven Samurai is a 1954 Japanese film.

Seven Samurai may also refer to:
Seven Samurai 20XX, a 2004 video game based on the film
7 Samurai (artist), a Swedish musical duo
Samurai 7, a 2004 anime series based on the film
"The Seven Samurai", a song by Photek
The "Seven Samurai", a group of optical astronomers who published numerous papers, including the proposing the existence of a Great Attractor: they were David Burstein, Roger Davies, Alan Dressler, Sandra Faber, Donald Lynden-Bell, Roberto Terlevich, and Gary A. Wegner